The 2021 Africa Cup of Nations (also referred to as AFCON 2021 or CAN 2021), known as the TotalEnergies 2021 Africa Cup of Nations for sponsorship reasons, was the 33rd edition of the Africa Cup of Nations, the biennial international men's football championship of Africa organised by the Confederation of African Football (CAF). The tournament was hosted by Cameroon, and took place from 9 January to 6 February 2022.

The tournament was originally scheduled to be played in June and July 2021. However, the CAF announced on 15 January 2020 that due to unfavourable climatic conditions during that period, the tournament had been rescheduled to be played between 9 January and 6 February 2021. On 30 June 2020, the CAF moved the tournament's dates for the second time to January 2022 following the effects of the COVID-19 pandemic across the continent, whilst retaining the name 2021 Africa Cup of Nations for sponsorship purposes.

Algeria were the defending champions, but were eliminated in the group stage. The hosts, Cameroon, lost their bid for the title in the semi-finals after losing on penalties to Egypt and eventually finished third. Senegal won the trophy for the first time after beating Egypt on penalties in the final.

Host selection
After the CAF Executive Committee meeting on 24 January 2014, it was announced that there were three official candidates for the 2021 edition:

Bids:
Algeria
Guinea
Ivory Coast
Rejected bids:
DR Congo
Gabon
Zambia

This list was different from the list of the host nation bids for both the 2019 and 2021 edition of the Cup of Nations as announced by CAF in November 2013, with Democratic Republic of the Congo, Gabon and Zambia also on the original list. All three official candidates also bid for hosting the 2019 Africa Cup of Nations.

The decision of the host country was postponed from early 2014 to grant each bidding country adequate time to receive the inspection delegation. After the final vote at the CAF Executive Committee meeting, on 20 September 2014, the CAF announced the hosts for the 2019, 2021 and 2023 AFCON tournaments: 2019 to Cameroon, 2021 to Ivory Coast, and 2023 to Guinea.

Host change
On 30 November 2018, CAF stripped Cameroon of hosting the 2019 Africa Cup of Nations because of delays in the construction of stadiums and other necessary infrastructure; it was relocated to Egypt. CAF President at the time, Ahmad Ahmad, said that Cameroon had agreed to host the 2021 tournament instead. Consequently, Ivory Coast, original hosts of 2021, will host the 2023 Africa Cup of Nations, and Guinea, original hosts of 2023, will host the 2025 Africa Cup of Nations. On 30 January 2019, the CAF President confirmed the timetable shift, after a meeting with Ivory Coast President, Alassane Ouattara, in Abidjan, Ivory Coast.

Effects of the COVID-19 pandemic
The tournament was originally scheduled to take place between 9 January and 6 February 2021. The preliminary round and two matchdays of the qualifying group stage had already been played between 9 October and 19 November 2019. The third and fourth matchdays of the qualifying group stage, which were initially scheduled to take place from 23 to 31 March and 1 to 9 June 2020 respectively, were postponed and all remaining qualifying matches rescheduled due to the outbreak of the COVID-19 pandemic in Africa.

On 19 June 2020, the CAF stated it was undecided about when continental competitions would resume, and were prioritising new schedules for the 2019–20 CAF Champions League and the 2019–20 CAF Confederation Cup semi-finals, the postponed 2020 African Nations Championship and the 2020 Africa Women Cup of Nations, alongside the 2021 Africa Cup of Nation, as football competitions across the continent had been postponed, cancelled or suspended.

On 30 June 2020, however, the CAF announced the rescheduling of the 2021 Africa Cup of Nations to January 2022 "after consultation with stakeholders and taking into consideration the current global situation" according to a published statement, with new dates to be announced at a later date. Subsequently, other continental competitions and events to be held were rescheduled or cancelled, including new dates for the remaining AFCON qualifiers, which were now to be completed by March 2021. On 31 March 2021, it was confirmed that the final tournament would take place from 9 January to 6 February 2022, exactly one year after its originally scheduled start date.

Qualification

Qualified teams
The following teams qualified for the tournament.

Format
A total of 24 teams competed in the final tournament. Only the hosts received an automatic qualification spot, with the other 23 teams qualifying through a qualification tournament. For the finals, the 24 teams were drawn into six groups of four teams. The teams in each group played a single round robin, and after the group stage, the top two teams from each group and the four highest ranked third-placed teams advanced to the round of 16. From then on the tournament proceeded with a knockout phase.

Match ball
CAF announced the official match ball named Toghu on 23 November 2021. It was made by English manufacturer Umbro.

Mascot 
The mascot, "Mola", was unveiled on 17 May 2021, during a ceremony in Yaoundé. He was a lion and his kit bore resemblance to Cameroon's home colours, with words saying "Cameroon" with "2021" on the top and bottom of the kit.

Match officials
The following referees were chosen for the 2021 Africa Cup of Nations, with two referees from CONCACAF assigned. The list consists of 24 referees, 31 assistant referees and eight video assistant referees from 36 countries.

Referees

  Mustapha Ghorbal
  Hélder Martins Rodrigues de Carvalho
  Joshua Bondo
  Pacifique Ndabihawenimana
  Blaise Yuven Ngwa
  Mahmoud El Banna
  Amin Omar
  Bamlak Tessema Weyesa
  Daniel Nii Laryea
  Bakary Gassama
  Mario Escobar (CONCACAF)
  Peter Waweru
  Boubou Traore
  Dahane Beida
  Ahmad Imtehaz Heeralall
  Rédouane Jiyed
  Jean-Jacques Ndala Ngambo
  Salima Mukansanga
  Maguette N'Diaye
  Issa Sy
  Bernard Camille
  Victor Gomes
  Sadok Selmi
  Janny Sikazwe

Assistant referees

  Abdelhak Etchiali
  Mokrane Gourari
  Jerson Emiliano dos Santos
  Seydou Tiama
  Elvis Guy Noupue Nguegoue
  Carine Atezambong Fomo
  Issa Yaya
  Soulaimane Almadine
  Mahmoud Ahmed Abouelregal
  Ahmed Hossam Taha
  Sidiki Sidibe
  Liban Abdourazak Ahmed
  Gilbert Cheruiyot
  Souru Phatsoane
  Attia Amsaaed
  Lionel Andrianantenaina
  Mustapha Akarkad
  Lahcen Azgaou
  Zakaria Brinsi
  Fatiha Jermoumi
  Arsenio Maringula
  Mahamadou Yahaya
  Samuel Pwadutakam
  Olivier Safari
  Djibril Camara
  El Hadj Malick Samba
  James Fredrick Emile
  Zakhele Siwela
  Mohammed Abdallah Ibrahim
  Khalil Hassani
  Dick Okello

Video assistant referees

  Lahlou Benbraham
  Mehdi Abid Charef
  Mahmoud Mohamed Ashour
  Fernando Guerrero (CONCACAF)
  Samir Guezzaz
  Adil Zourak
  Bouchra Karboubi
  Haythem Guirat

Draw
The final draw was originally scheduled to take place on 25 June 2021, but was postponed to 17 August 2021.  The 24 teams were drawn into four groups of six.

Venues
With the Africa Cup of Nations expanded from 16 to 24 teams, six venues were used across five Cameroonian cities. The six stadiums selected to host matches were the Olembe Stadium and Stade Ahmadou Ahidjo, both in the capital Yaoundé, the Japoma Stadium in Douala, the Limbe Stadium in Limbe, the Kouekong Stadium in Bafoussam and the Roumde Adjia Stadium in Garoua. The opening match of the tournament and the final took place at the newly built 60,000 seater Olembe Stadium in Yaoundé.

Opening ceremony 

The opening ceremony of the stadium began at 10:00 with the setting up of the animation groups and the cultural activities which lasted until 14:00. Guests and officials were set up until the start of the opening match at 17:00. Among the guests were members of Confederation of African Football (CAF), members of the diplomatic corps, presidents of legislative and judicial institutions, members of government including the president of COCAN 2021 and the presidents of CAF and FIFA.

The set-up of officials ended by 16:00 with the arrival of the presidents of Comoros and Cameroon. After the performance of the hymns, the opening speech was made by Patrice Motsepe, CAF's president followed by the solemn opening of the competition by the President of the Republic of Cameroon, Paul Biya, after which a cultural parade of about an hour took place.

A cultural interlude representing the four cultural areas of Cameroon was presented with five hundred young ambassadors and the mascot Mola who participated in the dance, the host artist, Fally Ipupa offered a performance. During this parade, a virtual lion appeared to viewers, this was set up by Belgian graphic designer Thibault Baras on an idea of the creative company lib. Made in augmented reality and turned on a game engine, this lion was sixteen meters long, eight meters high and weighed a ton.

After the match, which took place from 17:00 to 19:00, there was a fireworks display.

Squads

Group stage
The top two teams of each group, along with the best four third-placed teams, advanced to the round of 16.
All times are local, WAT (UTC+1).

Tiebreakers
Teams were ranked according to points (3 points for a win, 1 point for a draw, 0 points for a loss), and if tied on points, the following tiebreaking criteria were applied, in the order given, to determine the rankings (Regulations Article 74):
 Points in head-to-head matches among tied teams;
 Goal difference in head-to-head matches among tied teams;
 Goals scored in head-to-head matches among tied teams;
 If more than two teams were tied, and after applying all head-to-head criteria above, if two teams were still tied, all head-to-head criteria above were applied exclusively to these two teams;
 Goal difference in all group matches;
 Goals scored in all group matches;
 Drawing of lots.

Group A

Group B

Group C

Group D

Group E

Group F

Ranking of third-placed teams

Combinations of matches in the round of 16

The specific match-ups involving the third-placed teams depended on which four third-placed teams qualified for the round of 16:

Knockout stage

In the knockout stage, extra time and a penalty shoot-out were used to decide the winner if necessary, except for the third place match, where a direct penalty shoot-out, without any extra time, was used to decide the winner if necessary (Regulations Article 75).

Bracket

Round of 16

Quarter-finals

Semi-finals

Third place play-off

Final

Statistics

Goalscorers

Broadcasting 
Below is the list of the 2021 AFCON broadcasting rights:

Controversies

Tunisia vs. Mali refereeing 
In the first match of Group F between Tunisia and Mali, Zambian referee Janny Sikazwe ended the match in the 85th minute before changing his mind. He then signalled the end of the match in the 89th minute without calculating overtime, which would have been significant due to the large number of changes (9 changes between the two teams) and double verification of the video assistant referee.

However, the referee announced the return of the match after 25 minutes of stopping to complete 3 minutes, with the Tunisian team refusing to complete it. A forensic report stated that Sikazwe suffered heat stroke, which contributed to his mishandling of the match.

Mauritanian national anthem 
Before the second match of Group F between Mauritania and Gambia, the old Mauritanian national anthem was played three times; the stadium announcer said that the Mauritanian players would sing the anthem themselves, but a third failed attempt was soon cut off after the old anthem of the country was played again.

Buea shooting 
In Buea, in the Southwest Region of Cameroon, gunfire broke out between the Cameroon Armed Forces and gunmen. The shooting is believed to have been between members of the Cameroon Army, deployed in large numbers during the competition, and Ambazonian separatist fighters, this incident is part of the Anglophone Crisis that has been raging since 2017 in the Northwest and Southwest regions of Cameroon.

Cameroon fans stampede 

Before the fourth match in the knockout stage between hosts Cameroon and the Comoros, which took place on 24 January 2022 at the Olembe Stadium, a stampede broke out among the Cameroonian fans. Eight deaths were recorded: two women and four men, all in their thirties, in addition to two children.

The ministry indicated that about 50 people were injured in the stampede, including two people with multiple injuries and two others with serious head injuries, and a baby was immediately transferred to the General Hospital in Yaoundé in a medically stable condition.

Relocation of matches from Japoma Stadium 
Initially, Japoma Stadium in Douala was scheduled to host four matches in the knockout stage, in addition to six in the group stage. However, after the field was criticised by coaches and players alike during the group stage, the organisation committee decided mid-tournament to relocate all matches from Japoma Stadium to other stadiums such as Limbe Stadium and Ahmadou Ahidjo Stadium in Yaoundé. Djamel Belmadi, coach of defending champions, Algeria, who left the tournament in the group stages, said that "It is not of a level permitting total fluidity and what we hope for from big tournaments like the African Cup of Nations".

Awards
The following awards were given at the conclusion of the tournament:
Man of the Competition:  Sadio Mané
Golden Boot:  Vincent Aboubakar (8 goals)
Best Goalkeeper:  Édouard Mendy
Best Young Player:  Issa Kaboré
Fair Play Award: 
Best XI

Source:

Notes

References

External links

2021 Africa Cup of Nations Organizing Committee 

 
2021
Nations
International association football competitions hosted by Cameroon
football
January 2022 sports events in Africa
February 2022 sports events in Africa
Association football events postponed due to the COVID-19 pandemic